Hot potassium carbonate, HPC, is a method used to remove carbon dioxide from gas mixtures, in some contexts referred to as carbon scrubbing. The inorganic, basic compound potassium carbonate is mixed with a gas mixture and the liquid absorbs carbon dioxide through chemical processes. The technology is a form of chemical absorption, and was developed for natural gas sweetening (i.e., removal of acidic from raw natural gas). Currently it is also considered, among others, as a post-combustion capture process, in the contexts of carbon capture and storage and carbon capture and utilization. As a post-combustion CO2 capture process, the technology is planned to be used on full scale on a heat plant in Stockholm from 2025.

References 

Carbon capture and storage
Climate engineering
Scrubbers
Gas technologies